Coburg Island is an uninhabited island in Qikiqtaaluk, Nunavut, Canada. It is one of the members of Queen Elizabeth Islands located in Baffin Bay's Lady Ann Strait. It is separated from Ellesmere Island by Glacier Strait; Devon Island is to the south.

Elsewhere in Nunavut, there is also a tiny Saxe-Coburg Island, lying in Davis Strait, south of Leopold Island, itself east of Baffin Island's Cape Mercy (Cumberland Peninsula).

Geography

The island is characterized by cliffs, rocky shores, and tundra.

Fauna
Bowhead whale, narwhal, polar bear, seal, walrus, and white whale frequent the area.

Conservation
Coburg Island has several designated conservation classifications including International Biological Program site and Key Migratory Bird Terrestrial Habitat site. Along with the surrounding marine area, the island is a part of the Nirjutiqavvik National Wildlife Area.

Cambridge Point, off of the southeastern Marina Peninsula, is a Canadian Important Bird Area notable for black guillemot, black-legged kittiwake, glaucous gull, northern fulmar, and thick-billed murre. A portion of Cambridge Point is within the NWA.

References

External links
 Coburg Island in the Atlas of Canada - Toporama; Natural Resources Canada

Islands of Baffin Bay
Important Bird Areas of Qikiqtaaluk Region
Islands of the Queen Elizabeth Islands
Uninhabited islands of Qikiqtaaluk Region
Important Bird Areas of Arctic islands
Seabird colonies